Baselios Sakralla 3rd of Aleppo was the Maphriyano (Catholicos) of the Syriac Orthodox Church of the East from 1748 to 1760.

Maphriyano Sakralla came to India in 1751 and was buried at Kandanad Marth Mariyam Church in 1764 AD.

He was declared a Saint by the Patriarch of the Syriac Orthodox Church in 2008.

References

Syriac Orthodox Church saints
1764 deaths
People from Aleppo
18th-century Oriental Orthodox archbishops
Maphrians
18th-century people from the Ottoman Empire
Oriental Orthodox bishops in the Ottoman Empire